William C. Watson (October 5, 1938 – November 5, 1997) was an American actor.

Career
Born in Chicago, Illinois, Watson appeared in many television series and films, In the Heat of the Night (1967),  Lawman (1971), The Hunting Party (1971), Chato's Land (1972), Executive Action (1973) and Wholly Moses!  (1980).

In the 1960s and 1970s, he guest-starred on several TV series such as The Rat Patrol, The High Chaparral, Bonanza, Gunsmoke, The Streets of San Francisco, Kojak, Hawaii Five-0, The Rookies, Starsky and Hutch (in the episode "Captain Dobey, You're Dead"), The Rockford Files, M*A*S*H, The Dukes of Hazzard, Emergency!, CHiPs, Quinn Martin's Tales of the Unexpected (in the episode "The Force of Evil"), and many more. His last appearance was in the film It's Alive III: Island of the Alive (1987) with Michael Moriarty. He was best remembered as the slave trader who captured young Kunta Kinte in the TV miniseries Roots. He appeared in two episodes of Cannon entitled "Perfect Alibi" and "Madman", which aired on 31/10/73 and 3/3/76 respectively.

Filmography
1966: Girl on a Chain Gang - Sheriff Sonny Lew Wymer
1967: In the Heat of the Night - McNeil
1971: Lawman - Choctaw Lee 
1971: The Hunting Party - Jim Loring
1972: Chato's Land - Harvey Lansing
1972: Hawaii Five-0Good Night Baby Time to Die!-L.B.Barker
1973: The Marcus-Nelson Murders (TV Series) - Det. Matt Black
1973: The Mack - Jed
1973: Executive Action - Technician - (Leader of Team B)
1974: M*A*S*H  (S3 E12 A Full Rich Day) - Lt Smith
1974: Gunsmoke (S20E11&12) Island in the Desert - Gard Dixon
1975: Captain Dobey, You're Dead (TV Series) - Leo Moon
1975: The Rockford Files (S1 E23 The Four Pound Brick) - Ross
1976: Emergency! (S6 E10 Welcome to Santa Rosa County) - Tom
1976: The Passover Plot - Roman Captain
1977: Roots (TV Mini-Series) - Gardner
1977: Quinn Martin's Tales of the Unexpected (TV Series) - Teddy Jakes
1977: Heroes - Bartender (uncredited)
1978: Stingray - Lonigan
1979: CHiPs (TV Series) - Sgt. Chapman
1980: Dallas (TV Series) - Hutch McKinney
1980: Wholly Moses! - Bandit
1982: The Sword and the Sorcerer - Karak
1986: Magnum, P.I. (TV Series) - Donald Hayes
1987: It's Alive III: Island of the Alive - Cabot (final film role)

References

External links

1938 births
1997 deaths
Male actors from Chicago
American male television actors
American male film actors
20th-century American male actors